Tandarra is an Australian television series which screened on the Seven Network in Australia in 1976 and on ITV (including the London Weekend Television and Anglia regions) in the UK. It was a follow-up series to Cash and Company which screened in 1975 and consisted of 13 one-hour episode. Tandarra and Cash and Company were set during the Victorian gold rush period of the 1850s.

The change in format and title was necessitated by the departure of Serge Lazareff who played the title character Sam Cash in the original series Cash and Company. Two of the original characters continued in Tandarra: Joe Brady (Gus Mercurio) and Jessica Johnson (Penne Hackforth-Jones). The other main character was Ryler (Gerard Kennedy). who had been introduced in the final episode of Cash and Company. He had been a bounty hunter who was later convinced of Joe's innocence and decided to join him.

The title was taken from the name of the homestead owned by Jessica, and the series primarily dealt with the adventures of running the large farming property. The premise of the first series, namely that Joe and Sam were fugitives from the law and were being assisted by Jessica, was totally removed. No reference to the Sam Cash character was ever made in this series. The previous antagonist, the corrupt police trooper, Lieutenant Keogh (Bruce Kerr) only appeared in the first episode of Tandarra, and the character of Jessica's servant, Annie (Anne Scott-Pendlebury) only appeared in the second.

Patrick Edgeworth said later he felt the series was hurt by the fact the leads were no longer fugitives from the law, which reduced the tension. The series was released in Australia on DVD in May 2015 by Umbrella Entertainment.

References

External links
 
 Classic Australian Television website
 Watch the opening of Tandarra
 Umbrella Entertainment website listing

Australian drama television series
Television series set in the 1850s
Seven Network original programming
Television shows set in Victoria (Australia)
Television shows set in colonial Australia
1976 Australian television series debuts
1976 Australian television series endings
Australian Western (genre) films